Helvi Lemmikki Leiviskä (25 May 1902 — 12 August 1982) was a Finnish composer, writer, music educator and librarian at the Sibelius Academy.

Life
Helvi Leiviskä was born in 1902 in Helsinki, Finland, and in 1927 graduated in composition from the Helsinki Music Institute (Sibelius Academy) where she studied with Erkki Melartin. She continued her studies in Vienna, and then returned to Finland where she studied with Leevi Madetoja.

She began work as a composer with a debut in 1935 and also worked as a music teacher privately and in public schools from 1922 to 1938. In 1933 she took a position as librarian at the Sibelius Academy.

After World War II, Leiviskä furthered her studies with Leo Funtek and wrote reviews for periodicals including Ilta-Sanomat as well as articles for several publications.

She died in Helsinki at 80 years of age.

Selected works
Piano Concerto, 1935
Triple Fugue for Orchestra, 1938
Symphony No. 1, 1947
Symphony No. 2, 1954
Symphony No. 3, 1971
Sinfonia Brevis, 1962
Folk Dance Suite (Kansantanssisarja), 1934
Hobgoblin of Darkness (Pimeän peikko), 1942
The Lost Continent (Mennyt manner) for choir and orchestra, 1957
Juha (film music), 1937
Violin Sonata, 1945
Piano Quartet, 1926

Discography
 Helvi Leiviskä: Violin Sonata, Piano Quartet, Symphony No. 3. Finlandia Classics FINCLA-1 (2012).

Awards 

 Pro Finlandia Medal, 1962

References

1902 births
1982 deaths
20th-century classical composers
Finnish music educators
Women classical composers
Finnish classical composers
Writers from Helsinki
Sibelius Academy alumni
Finnish librarians
Women librarians
Women music educators
Finnish women classical composers
20th-century women composers
20th-century Finnish composers